A Reality Tour was a worldwide concert tour by David Bowie in support of the Reality album. The tour began on 7 October 2003 at the Forum Copenhagen, Denmark, continuing through Europe, North America, Asia, including a return to New Zealand and Australia for the first time since the 1987 Glass Spider Tour.  At over 110 shows, the tour was the longest tour of Bowie's career. A heart attack in late June 2004 forced the cancellation of some dates near the end of the tour.  Bowie retired from performing live in 2006, making this tour his last. 

The tour grossed US$46 million, making it the ninth-highest-grossing tour of 2004.

Background
Bowie announced the tour in June 2003, intending to play to over a million people across 17 countries, and was billed as his first major tour since the Outside Tour of 1995. Rehearsals for the tour begin in July, with the band from his previous Heathen Tour mostly unchanged; Mark Plati had other work booked, so guitarist Gerry Leonard was made the new bandleader. The band played a warm-up gig on 19 August in New York to an audience of about 500 people at The Chance theater. Starting in September, Bowie appeared on national radio and TV shows in Germany and France before doing a "live and interactive music event" staged in London on 8 September, one of the first live streams of a rock concert, and the first to be broadcast in 5.1 sound. This show was beamed live to audiences around the world, although some countries (such as the Japan and Australia) didn't broadcast the show until the following day, and some countries (like the US) did not broadcast the show until a week later. Some theaters report not receiving the center channel of audio of the show, meaning that some audiences didn't hear Bowie's singing as part of the broadcast (strictly an issue at the theaters' end, according to Tony Visconti, who was responsible for the mix).

Bowie continued publicity for the album and tour, playing songs on shows such as Friday Night with Jonathan Ross on BBC One, The Today Show, Last Call with Carson Daly, and The Late Show with David Letterman. Tracks performed during these shows included "New Killer Star", "Modern Love", "Never Get Old", and "Hang On to Yourself". Finally, in late September, Bowie and the band played songs for AOL Online, performing "New Killer Star", "I'm Afraid of Americans", "Rebel Rebel", "Days" and "Fall Dog Bombs the Moon", all of which were streamed to AOL customers over the next few months. By the end of September, Bowie and band were in Brussels for final rehearsals.

Tour design
The tour itself was described by Bowie biographer Nicholas Pegg as "in some respects [...] even more theatrical" than the "Sound+Vision Tour", one of Bowie's more theatrical undertakings. The stage included a giant LED screen with a raised catwalk, multiple platforms pushing out into the audience, staircases and "huge, bleached white tree branches" that dangled "gracefully from either side of the stage". Bowie himself helped design the stage alongside designer Therese Depreze, lighting designer Tom Kenny and visual director Laura Frank.

Repertoire
The set list included tracks spanning Bowie's 30 plus years in the music business, from The Man Who Sold the World (1970) all the way to Reality (2003), along with collaborations such as "Sister Midnight" (originally from The Idiot (1977) by Iggy Pop) and "Under Pressure" (released as a single (1981) by Bowie and Queen later found on Hot Space released the following year), and snippets and teasers of Bowie classics such as "Space Oddity" and "Golden Years". The band had rehearsed around 60 songs for the tour, and the large repertoire of available songs allowed them to change the setlist from night to night, sometimes making up the setlist on the fly, a departure from some of Bowie's previous and heavily choreographed tours like the Serious Moonlight Tour of 1983, the Glass Spider Tour of 1987, and the Sound+Vision Tour of 1990. Bowie and his band played over two hours every night of the tour, playing more than 30 songs at some venues. One song that was rehearsed but not performed is "Win" from his 1974 album Young Americans; it never made it further than the occasional soundcheck for the tour.

Reception
The 24 January 2004 show in Vancouver, Canada was reviewed positively, with the reviewer saying that "with Bowie's near-flawless vocals, brilliant band, and smartly executed show, you wind up with one of the finest old-school rock gigs the Canucks’ home rink has ever hosted." The review of the next show in Seattle on 25 January 2004 was similarly positive, saying Bowie, "still every inch a superstar ... still oozes charm and sex appeal" and called the setlist a "celebration of his whole body of work."

Tour incidents
The 6 May 2004, a performance at the James L. Knight Center, Miami, Florida was cancelled after lighting technician Walter "Wally Gator" Thomas fell to his death prior to Bowie going onstage. At the show in Oslo on 18 June 2004, Bowie was struck in the left eye with a lollipop thrown by an audience member.

Heart attack
On 23 June, while on stage in Prague for the tour, Bowie had a heart attack (misdiagnosed at the time as a pinched nerve), which required him to leave the stage (and finally end the show early) to receive medical attention. The tour was officially curtailed after the Hurricane Festival performance in Scheeßel, Germany on 25 June 2004, as a result of continued discomfort. On 30 June, the tour was officially cancelled after Bowie was diagnosed with an acutely blocked artery that required an angioplasty procedure (performed on 26 June).

Live recordings

A DVD video of the Point Theatre, Dublin performances of 2003 was released as A Reality Tour in 2004. A CD of the same performances was released as A Reality Tour in 2010.

Tour band
David Bowie – vocals, guitars, stylophone, harmonica
Earl Slick – guitar
Gerry Leonard – guitar, backing vocals, music director
Gail Ann Dorsey – bass guitar, vocals
Sterling Campbell – drums
Mike Garson – keyboards, piano
Catherine Russell – keyboards, percussion, guitar, backing vocals

Tour dates

On 19 August 2003 Bowie performed a one-off show in Poughkeepsie, New York at The Chance, as a warm up show.
On 8 September 2003 Bowie performed a show at the Riverside Studios in London which was a 'satellite show'. This was a live performance beamed via satellite to cinemas and theatres across Europe and due to time delay the following day across Asia, Australia, North and South America.

Notes

Cancellations and rescheduled shows

Songs
Notation:
 DVD/CD Included on A Reality Tour (film) and A Reality Tour (live album)
 CD Included on the live album
 iTunes Available as Digital download bonus tracks (iTunes) for the live album

From David Bowie
 "Space Oddity"
From The Man Who Sold the World
 "The Man Who Sold the World" DVD/CD
 "The Supermen"
From Hunky Dory
 "Changes" DVD/CD
 "Life on Mars?" DVD/CD
 "Quicksand"
 "The Bewlay Brothers"
 "Queen Bitch"
From The Rise and Fall of Ziggy Stardust and the Spiders from Mars
 "Five Years" DVD/CD
 "Starman"
 "Hang On to Yourself" DVD/CD
 "Ziggy Stardust" DVD/CD
 "Suffragette City"
From Aladdin Sane
 "Panic in Detroit"
 "The Jean Genie"
From Diamond Dogs
 "Diamond Dogs"
 "Rebel Rebel" DVD/CD
From Young Americans
 "Fame" DVD/CD (Bowie, John Lennon, Carlos Alomar)
From Station to Station
 "Station to Station"
From Low
 "Breaking Glass" CD (Bowie, Dennis Davis, George Murray)
 "Sound and Vision"
 "Always Crashing in the Same Car"
 "Be My Wife" DVD/CD
 "A New Career in a New Town"
From "Heroes"
 ""Heroes"" DVD/CD (Bowie, Brian Eno)
From Lodger
 "Fantastic Voyage" DVD/CD (Bowie, Eno)
From Scary Monsters (and Super Creeps)
 "Ashes to Ashes" DVD/CD
 "Fashion"
From Let's Dance
 "Modern Love"
 "China Girl" CD written by Iggy Pop and Bowie)
 "Let's Dance"
From Tonight
 "Loving the Alien" DVD/CD
 "Blue Jean"
From Outside
 "Hallo Spaceboy" DVD/CD (Bowie, Eno)
 "The Motel" (Bowie, Eno) DVD/CD
From Earthling
 "Battle for Britain (The Letter)" DVD/CD (Bowie, Reeves Gabrels, Mark Plati)
 "I'm Afraid of Americans" DVD/CD (Bowie, Eno)
From Heathen
 "Sunday" DVD/CD
 "Cactus" DVD/CD (written by Black Francis)
 "Slip Away" DVD/CD
 "Afraid" DVD/CD
 "I've Been Waiting for You" (originally from Neil Young (1968) by Neil Young; written by Young)
 "5:15 the Angels Have Gone" iTunes
 "Heathen (The Rays)" DVD/CD
From Reality
 "New Killer Star" DVD/CD
 "Pablo Picasso" (written by Jonathan Richman)
 "Never Get Old" DVD/CD
 "The Loneliest Guy" DVD/CD
 "Looking for Water"
 "She'll Drive the Big Car"
 "Days" iTunes
 "Fall Dog Bombs the Moon" CD
 "Try Some, Buy Some" (written by George Harrison)
 "Reality" DVD/CD
 "Bring Me the Disco King" DVD/CD (originally written and recorded for Black Tie White Noise (1993) and recorded once again for Earthling (1997))
Other songs:
 "A Hard Day's Night" (from A Hard Day's Night (1964) by The Beatles; written by Lennon and Paul McCartney)
 "All the Young Dudes" DVD/CD (from All the Young Dudes (1972) by Mott the Hoople; written by Bowie)
 "Bang a Gong (Get It On)" (from Electric Warrior (1971) by T.Rex; written by Marc Bolan)
 "Do You Know the Way to San José" (from Dionne Warwick in Valley of the Dolls (1968) by Dionne Warwick; written by Burt Bacharach and Hal David)
 "Here Comes the Sun" (from Abbey Road (1969) by The Beatles; written by Harrison)
 "It Can't Happen Here" (from Freak Out! (1966) by The Mothers of Invention; written by Frank Zappa)
 "Liza Jane" (Bowie's first ever single, released under the name "Davie Jones and the King Bees" in 1964; written by Leslie Conn)
 "Puppet on a String" (a single released for the 1967 Eurovision Song Contest by its winner Sandie Shaw; written by Bill Martin and Phil Coulter)
 "Rumble" (a single released in 1958 by Link Wray & His Ray Men; written by Milt Grant and Link Wray)
 "Sister Midnight" DVD/CD (from The Idiot by Iggy Pop, written by Pop, Bowie and Alomar)
 "Song 2" (from Blur (1997) by Blur; written by Damon Albarn, Graham Coxon, Alex James and Dave Rowntree)
 "Summertime" (from the opera Porgy and Bess (1935); written by George Gershwin, DuBose Heyward, Dorothy Heyward and Ira Gershwin)
 "Under Pressure" DVD/CD (a single released in 1981 by Bowie and Queen later found on Hot Space released the following year; written by Bowie, John Deacon, Brian May, Freddie Mercury, Roger Taylor)
 "White Light/White Heat" (from White Light/White Heat (1968) by The Velvet Underground; written by Lou Reed)
 "Y.M.C.A." (from Cruisin' by Village People, written by Henri Belolo, Jacques Morali and Victor Willis)

Notes

References

David Bowie concert tours
2003 concert tours
2004 concert tours